Team3M was a Belgian UCI Continental team founded in 2013. It participated in UCI Continental Circuits races. It is sponsored by the American multinational 3M.

The team disbanded at the end of the 2016 season.

2016 Roster

Major wins
2015
Omloop van het Waasland, Geert van der Weijst
Stage 4 Tour de Normandie, Nicolas Vereecken

References

UCI Continental Teams (Europe)
Cycling teams based in Belgium
Cycling teams established in 2013
2013 establishments in Belgium
Defunct cycling teams based in Belgium